Martely is a rural locality (a village) in Vereshchaginsky District, Perm Krai, Russia. The population was 3 as of 2010.

Geography 
Martely is located 42 km west of Vereshchagino (the district's administrative centre) by road. Fedyashino is the nearest rural locality.

References 

Rural localities in Vereshchaginsky District